Hugh Cameron may refer to:

Hugh Cameron (politician) (1836–1918), Canadian politician
Hugh Cameron (Rochdale footballer), played for Rochdale in 1921-22 season
Hugh Cameron (footballer, born 1927) (1927–2009), Scottish professional footballer
Hugh Cameron (cyclist), British racing cyclist
Hugh Cameron (artist) (1835–1918), Scottish artist